Gilles-Arnaud Bailly (born 19 September 2005) is a Belgian tennis player.

Bailly has a career high ATP singles ranking of 1171 achieved on 12 September 2022. He also has a career high ATP doubles ranking of 1854 achieved on 29 August 2022. He has a career high ITF junior combined ranking of 1 achieved on 28 November 2022 and ends 2022 season as number 1, winning the ITF Junior World Champion title.

Bailly was a runner-up at the 2022 French Open and the 2022 US Open in the boys' singles competition.

He made his debut at the 2022 European Open in Antwerp where he received a wildcard for the main draw competition. He lost in the first round to David Goffin despite playing for three hours and winning the second set.

Junior Grand Slam finals

Singles: 2 (2 finals)

References

External links

2005 births
Living people
Belgian male tennis players
21st-century Belgian people